Frederick of Blankenheim (c. 1355 – Castle Ter Horst (Loenen), 9 October 1423) was bishop of Strasbourg from 1375 to 1393 as Friedrich II, and bishop of Utrecht from 1393 to 1423 as Frederik III.

Strasbourg and Utrecht
Frederik van Blankenheim studied law in Paris and was named bishop of Strasbourg in 1375. His reign was not a success, and with help from William I of Guelders and Jülich he was transferred to Utrecht, where he proved to be an able ruler. Supported by the Lichtenbergers faction, he managed to maintain his rights over the cities in the bishoprics, the local nobility and the surrounding counties of Holland and Guelders. He strengthened ecclesiastical authority in the Oversticht and forced the city of Groningen to recognise his authority. In 1407 he granted city rights to Coevorden.

Wars
As ally of William VI, Count of Holland, he took part in the Arkel-war of 1406, through which he gained possession of Hagestein. The Hollandic faction-struggle around Jacqueline, Countess of Hainaut forced the aged bishop to fight a war with Holland and Guelders from 1419 to 1422, in which the bishopric was barely able to keep itself standing.

Church matters
Frederik did not personally deal with churchely matters, instead letting a well-organised administration deal with it. His suffragan bishop was Hubertus Schenck (titular bishop of Hippus in Palestine).
He was a protector of the Modern Devotion, embodied in the Brethren of the Common Life.

Death
Frederik van Blankenheim died on October 9, 1423, and was buried in the Dom Church.

1350s births
1423 deaths
14th-century Roman Catholic bishops in the Holy Roman Empire
15th-century Roman Catholic bishops in the Holy Roman Empire
Bishops of Strasbourg
Prince-Bishops of Utrecht
Burials at St. Martin's Cathedral, Utrecht
People from Loenen